The Brazilian pygmy gecko (Chatogekko amazonicus) is a species of South American lizard in the family Sphaerodactylidae. The species is monotypic in the genus Chatogekko. It grows to a maximum total length (including tail) of only . It is found in leaf litter on the forest floor, and preys on springtails and mites. The species is oviparous.

The gecko's skin is highly hydrophobic, to the degree that Chatogekko amazonicus is able to avoid drowning in rainstorms despite its small size, and even float on water.

The following cladogram presented by Gamble et al. in 2011 represents phylogenetic relationships among the genera of sphaerodactyl geckos which were recognized as being valid at that time.

References

Further reading
Andersson LG (1918). "New Lizards from South America. Collected by Nils Holmgren and A. Roman". Arkiv för Zoologi 1 (16): 1–9. (Sphærodactylus amazonicus, new species, pp. 1–2).

Geckos
Reptiles described in 1918
Taxa named by Lars Gabriel Andersson